The Ravens is the name used for all of the men's intercollegiate athletic teams that play for Anderson University in Anderson, Indiana. The female intercollegiate teams are known as the Lady Ravens.

Men's sports offered at Anderson University include football, basketball, baseball, lacrosse, tennis, golf, soccer, cross country, and track & field. Women's sports offered at Anderson University include basketball, softball, lacrosse, tennis, volleyball, soccer, golf, cross country, and track & field.

Conference affiliation
The Ravens compete in athletics in the NCAA Division III and the Heartland Collegiate Athletic Conference.

Organization
Athletics at Anderson University are administered by the Anderson University Athletic Department.

Current facilities
Most athletic teams have on-campus facilities for competition, including Macholtz Stadium for football, and  O. C. Lewis Gymnasium for basketball and women’s volleyball.

Team colors
The official school colors for Anderson University are Orange and Black. White is often used as a secondary color and for alternate jerseys.

Mascot
Formerly the Tigers, AU's nickname was changed to the Ravens in 1937. The current mascot is Rodney the Raven.

Athletic team success and post season appearances

Football
In 1970 the Ravens played in the NAIA Division II National Football Championship and lost to Westminster (Pa.), 21–16.

The Anderson Ravens football team won the HCAC conference title in 2001 season.

Two former AU players currently playing professional football are Hyman Smith and Joel Steele. In 2008, a new all-weather synthetic field turf and outdoor game lights were installed at Macholtz Stadium.

The Kevin Donley era 
Kevin Donley has been one of the most successful coaches in NAIA football. After graduating from Anderson College in 1973, Donley returned to his alma mater in 1976 to serve two seasons as offensive coordinator. In 1978, at the age of 26, Donley was named the youngest head coach in the country. Over the next four years, Donley’s teams would compile an overall record of 28–9 (.757), winning the conference title in 1980 and 1981. Through 2017 and 71 years of Anderson football history, Donley’s overall winning percentage stands as the best among all Anderson football coaches.

1978 

(5–4 overall, 4–4 conference)

1979 

(7–2 overall, 6–2 conference)

1980 

(8–1 overall, 7–1 conference)

1981 
(8–2 overall, 8–0 conference)

Baseball
The baseball teams has qualified for postseason tournaments 30 of the last 32 years and 99 percent of the four-year players have graduated.    Some notable accomplishments are:
 Eight World Series appearances 
 19 years in the final Top 20 Coaches Poll 
 16 conference championships 
 32 players signed professional contracts 
 NAIA Indiana champions 12 times, 8 of last 9 years in NAIA 
 6 NCAA Div. III Regional appearances since 1993 
 3 NCAA Div. III World Series appearances.

Women's basketball
In more recent history, the women's basketball team made their first appearance in the Division III NCAA Tournament in 2000-2001.

Softball
The Softball team has posted a record of 214–195 over the past decade, reaching the NCAA regionals three times. In total, they have had 7 conference MVP's and 71 All-Conference players. The 1999 team was the most successful in school history. They finished with a total of 35 wins, including a 14–0 performance in conference play.

Men's soccer
The Men's Soccer team also became the first NCAA team, regardless of division, to be named Academic All-Americans 12 straight years.   The Women's team achieved 11 straight seasons. Major team accomplishments include, two HCAC tournament titles, two HCAC regular season titles, 38 All-Conference players, 28 NSCAA Academic All-American selections, three HCAC Players of the Year and two HCAC Freshmen of the Year.

Cross country teams
The men's cross country team has won 14 conference titles since 1988, having perfect scored twice, 16 most valuable runner awards, and 5 freshmen of the year awards (since 2000).  In addition, they have won 11 coach of the year awards. The women's cross country team has also won conference awards since 1993 including, 11 conference titles, 11 most valuable runner awards, 4 freshmen of the year awards (since 2000), and 10 coach of the year awards.

References

External links